Henry Honore was the Dean of Bangor from 1410 until 1413.

References 

15th-century Welsh Roman Catholic priests
Deans of Bangor
Year of birth missing
Year of death missing